Up for Love (original title: Un homme à la hauteur) is a 2016 Franco-Belgian romantic comedy film directed by Laurent Tirard and starring Jean Dujardin and Virginie Efira. The film is a remake of the 2013 Argentine film Corazón de León.

Plot 
Diane is a lawyer who went through a divorce a few years ago. After losing her phone, she receives a call from Alexandre, a funny and charming man who found the phone and intends to return it. As the conversation goes on, the two hit it off and decide to arrange a date. Diane heads for the meeting with great expectations only to realise Alexandre is a midget.

Cast 
 Jean Dujardin as Alexandre
 Virginie Efira as Diane
 Cédric Kahn as Bruno
 Stéphanie Papanian as Coralie
 César Domboy as Benji
 Edmonde Franchi as Monique
 Manöelle Gaillard as Nicole
 Bruno Gomila as Philippe
 Myriam Tekaïa as Stéphanie
 François-Dominique Blin as Sébastien

Reception
On the review aggregator website Rotten Tomatoes, which categorizes reviews only as positive or negative, 39% of 36 reviews are positive.

References

External links 
 

2016 films
2016 romantic comedy films
2010s French-language films
French romantic comedy films
Belgian romantic comedy films
Remakes of Argentine films
Gaumont Film Company films
Films directed by Laurent Tirard
French-language Belgian films
2010s French films